Zephaniah may refer to:

 Zephaniah, name of several people in the Bible Old Testament and Jewish Tanakh
 Zephaniah (name)
 Book of Zephaniah, book
 Apocalypse of Zephaniah, pseudepigraphic text
 Zephaniah Kingsley Plantation Home and Buildings, site of a former estate in Jacksonville, Florida

See also
Zeph (disambiguation)